The 2019 Indian general election for the 21 Parliamentary Constituencies were held in four phases to constitute the 17th Lok Sabha. The Legislative Assembly elections were held simultaneously with the General Elections in the state. Major political parties in the state were Biju Janata Dal, Indian National Congress and Bharatiya Janata Party.

Election Schedule 
The constituency-wise election schedule is as follows.

Opinion Polls

Candidates 
Major election candidates are:

Results 
The results of the election were declared on 23 May 2019. The elected public representatives are mentioned below:

Assembly segments wise lead of parties

References 

2019 Indian general election
2019 Indian general election by state or union territory
Indian general elections in Odisha
2010s in Odisha